Afontova Gora is a Late Upper Paleolithic and Mesolithic Siberian complex of archaeological sites located on the left bank of the Yenisei River near the city of Krasnoyarsk, Russia. Afontova Gora has cultural and genetic links to the people from Mal'ta-Buret'. The complex was first excavated in 1884 by Ivan Savenkov.

Afontova Gora is a complex, consisting of multiple stratigraphic layers, of five or more campsites. The campsites shows evidence of mammoth hunting and were likely the result of an eastward expansion of mammoth hunters. The human fossils discovered at Afontova Gora were stored in the Hermitage Museum.

Sites
Afontova Gora I is situated on the western bank of the Enisei River and has yielded the remains from horse, mammoth, reindeer, steppe bison, and large canids. A canid tibia has been dated 16,900 years old and the skull has been taxonomically described as being that of a dog, but it is now lost. Its description falls outside of the range of Pleistocene or modern northern wolves.

Afontova Gora II is the site where the human fossil remains were found. The site was first excavated in 1912-1914 by V.I. Gromov. In 1924, G.P. Sosnovsky, N.K. Auerbach, and V.I. Gromov discovered the first human fossils at the site. The remains of mammoth, Arctic fox, Arctic hare, reindeer, bison, and horse were discovered at the site.

Afontova Gora II consists of 7 layers. Layer 3 from Afontova Gora II is the most significant: the layer produced the largest amount of cultural artefacts and is the layer where the human fossil remains were discovered. Over 20,000 artefacts were discovered at layer 3: this layer produced over 450 tools and over 250 osseous artefacts (bone, antler, ivory). The fossils of two distinct individuals were discovered in the initial excavations: the upper premolar of an 11-15 year-old child and the left radius, ulna, humerus, phalanx, and frontal bone of an adult.

Afontova Gora III is the site where the initial excavation was undertaken by I. T. Savenkov in 1884. The site was disturbed by mining activities in the late 1880s. The site consists of 3 layers.

Afontova Gora V was discovered in 1996.  The remains of hare, pika, cave lion, horse, reindeer, bison, and partridge were discovered at the site.

Human remains
The bodies of two individuals, known as Afontova Gora 2 (AG2) and Afontova Gora 3 (AG3) were discovered within the complex. (The name Afontova Gora 1 refers to the remains of a canid.)

Afontova Gora 2
The human fossil remains of Afontova Gora 2 were discovered in the 1920s at Afontova Gora II and stored at the Hermitage Museum. The remains are dated to around 17,000 BP (16,930-16,490 BP).

In 2009, researchers visited the Hermitage Museum and extracted DNA from the humerus of Afontova Gora 2. Despite significant contamination, researchers succeeded in extracting low coverage genomes. DNA analysis confirmed that the individual was male.

The individual showed close genetic affinities to Mal'ta 1 (Mal'ta boy). Afontova Gora 2 also showed greater genetic affinity for the Karitiana people than for the Han Chinese. Around 1.9-2.7% of the genome was Neanderthal in origin.

Afontova Gora 3
In 2014, more human fossil remains were discovered at Afontova Gora II during salvage excavation before the construction of a new bridge over the Yenesei River. The remains belonged to two different females: the atlas of an adult female and the mandible and five lower teeth of a teenage girl (Afontova Gora 3) estimated to be around 14–15 years old. Initially, the new findings were presumed to be roughly contemporaneous with Afontova Gora 2. In 2017, direct AMS dating revealed that Afontova Gora 3 is dated to around 16,090 cal BC).

The mandible of Afontova Gora 3 was described as being gracile.

Researchers analyzing the dental morphology of Afontova Gora 3 concluded that the teeth showed distinct characteristics with most similarities to another fossil (the Listvenka child) from the Altai-Sayan region and were neither western nor eastern. Afontova Gora 3 and Listvenka showed distinct dental characteristics that were also different from other Siberian fossils, including those from Mal'ta.

DNA was extracted from one of the teeth of Afontova Gora 3 and analyzed. Compared to Afontova Gora 2, researchers were able to obtain higher coverage genomes from Afontova Gora 3. DNA analysis confirmed that the individual was female. mtDNA analysis revealed that Afontova Gora 3 belonged to the mitochondrial Haplogroup R1b. Around 2.9-3.7% of the genome was Neanderthal in origin.

In a 2016 study, researchers determined that Afontova Gora 2, Afontova Gora 3, and Mal'ta 1 (Mal'ta boy) shared common descent and were clustered together in a Mal'ta cluster. Genetically, Afontova Gora 3 is not closer to Afontova Gora 2 when compared to Mal'ta 1. When compared to Mal'ta 1, the Afontova Gora 3 lineage apparently contributed more to modern humans and is genetically closer to Native Americans.

Phenotypic analysis shows that Afontova Gora 3 carries the derived rs12821256 allele associated with blond hair color, making Afontova Gora 3 the earliest individual known to carry this derived allele.

References

Citations

Bibliography

 

Archaeological sites in Siberia
Upper Paleolithic sites
Krasnoyarsk Krai
Cultural heritage monuments in Krasnoyarsk Krai
Objects of cultural heritage of Russia of federal significance